Herald Reef is a reef  southwest of Petermann Island, lying on the north side of French Passage in the Wilhelm Archipelago, Antarctica. It was first charted by the French Antarctic Expedition, 1908–10, under Jean-Baptiste Charcot. It was so named by the UK Antarctic Place-Names Committee in 1959 because this reef heralds the approach to French Passage from the east.

References

Reefs of Graham Land
Landforms of the Wilhelm Archipelago